Ambadi Dam, is an earthfill dam on Sivana river near Village Andhaner, Kannad, Aurangabad district in state of Maharashtra in India.

Specifications

Purpose
 Irrigation
 Water Supply For Kannad City.

See also
 Dams in Maharashtra
 List of reservoirs and dams in India

References

Dams in Aurangabad district, Maharashtra
Dams completed in 1978
1978 establishments in Maharashtra